Pray for Japan is a 2012 Japanese documentary film about the 2011 Tōhoku earthquake and tsunami. Stu Levy produced and directed the film. All of the crew, including Levy, volunteered to make it, and all of the profits from it will be donated to the non-profit organization JEN for their Tōhoku reconstruction projects. The film premiered in Tokyo on March 6, 2012, and showed for one night only in 15 North American AMC Theatres on March 14, 2012.

The 97-minute film moves between several perspectives, including survivors living in a shelter, a middle school staff, volunteers, and a young musician who lost several family members. A woman's voiceover reads poetry interspersed between these different perspectives. The overall effect is to show that despite the disaster, the survivors are moving forward with their recovery.

References

External links

2012 films
2012 documentary films
Documentary films about the 2011 Tōhoku earthquake and tsunami
Japanese documentary films
2010s Japanese films